The Firenze–Pistoia was a single-day road bicycle race held annually in Tuscany, Italy. It was an individual time trial between Prato and Quarrata, in the Province of Pistoia. After 2005, the race was organised as a 1.1 event on the UCI Europe Tour. It was cancelled due to organisation problems.

Winners

References

External links 
 Official Website 
 Palmarès by Memoire-du-cyclisme 

Defunct cycling races in Italy
Cycle races in Italy
UCI Europe Tour races
Recurring sporting events established in 1985
1985 establishments in Italy
Recurring sporting events disestablished in 2008
2008 disestablishments in Italy